KWRL (102.3 FM, "The River") is a radio station licensed to serve La Grande, in the U.S. state of Oregon. The station is owned by Elkhorn Media Group and the broadcast license is held by KWRL, LLC.

KWRL broadcasts a hot adult contemporary music format.

History
This station received its original construction permit for a new FM station broadcasting with 3,000 watts of effective radiated power on 100.1 MHz from the Federal Communications Commission on May 2, 1988.  The new station was assigned the call letters KWRL by the FCC on June 27, 1988.  KWRL received its license to cover from the FCC on November 25, 1988.

In January 1996, KWRL received authorization to move to 99.9 MHz and upgrade from a class A to a class C1 station with 60,000 watts of effective radiated power.

In October 1998, original license holder Grande Ronde Broadcasting, Inc., reached an agreement to sell this station to Capps Broadcast Group through their KSRV, Inc., subsidiary. The deal was approved by the FCC on December 14, 1998, and the transaction was consummated on December 18, 1998.

Effective August 28, 2012, KWRL was sold by Capps Broadcast Group to KWRL, LLC for $750,000.

In 2017, KWRL moved from 99.9 MHz to 102.3 MHz with no other changes in power and transmitter location.

Construction permit

References

External links
KWRL official website

WRL
Hot adult contemporary radio stations in the United States
La Grande, Oregon
Radio stations established in 1988
1988 establishments in Oregon